

Richard Martin Gans (7 March 1880 – 27 June 1954), German of Jewish origin, born in Hamburg, was the physicist who founded the Physics Institute of the National University of La Plata, Argentina. He was its Director in two different periods.

During the first one, starting in 1911, he continued the work started by Emil Bose raising the research level of the institute to international renown. In 1914 he founded the publication of a scientific journal: Contribución al estudio de las ciencias fisicomatemáticas, with two series: matematicofísica and técnica.
 
His second period in La Plata was from the late 1940s through the early 1950s, when he played an important role as member of one of the commissions which reviewed Ronald Richter's claims related to the Huemul Project.

After leaving La Plata in 1951 he taught theoretical and advanced physics at the University of Buenos Aires.

Gans theory is named after Richard Gans. This theory gives the solutions to the Maxwell equations for prolate and oblate spheroidal particles. It is an extension of Mie theory and thus sometimes called Mie-Gans theory. He first published these equations describing the scattering of elongated particles in 1912 for gold particles. In 1915, the solution for silver particles was published. Gans also rederived Lord Rayleigh scattering approximation for optically soft spheres, which is now known as Rayleigh–Gans approximation.

His doctoral students include Daniele Amati and Alberto Sirlin.

Studies 
Gans graduated in 1901, summa cum laude, with the title of Dr.Phil.Nat. at the University of Strasbourg. His doctoral advisor was Karl Ferdinand Braun.

Research and teaching

Academic timeline 
 1901–02 University of Heidelberg
 1903–11 University of Tübingen 
 1911–12 University of Strasbourg 
 1912–25 Universidad de La Plata 
 1925–35 University of Königsberg 
– Interrupted: 3rd Reich, World War II, postwar –
 1947–51 Universidad de La Plata 
 1951–53 Universidad de Buenos Aires

Publications 
Gans published extensively in Annalen der Physik .

References 
 Santos Mayo Letter in Physics Today (2004)
 Bibliothèque Virtuelle Leite Lopes
 Klich, Ignacio. Richard Gans, Guido Beck and the Role of German Speaking Jewish Immigrants in the Early Days of Argentina's Nuclear Project. Ibero-Amerikanisches Archiv 21:1–2 (1995):127–67 – F1401.I24 
 Gaviola, Enrique (1954). Richard Gans (1880–1954). Ciencia e Investigación, Buenos Aires. Vol. 10 (8), p. 384.
 Swinne, Edgar. Richard Gans: Hochschullehrer in Deutschland und Argentinien.Berliner Beiträge Zur Geschitchte Der Naturwissenschaften Und Der Technik (BBGNT): 14 ERST Verlag Berlin 1992. . Published in translation to Spanish as: Richard Gans Profesor Universitario en Alemania y Argentina. Published by the Physics Museum of the University of La Plata.

External links
 

1880 births
1954 deaths
Scientists from Hamburg
19th-century German Jews
Jewish scientists
20th-century German physicists
German emigrants to Argentina
20th-century Argentine physicists
Jewish physicists